New Orleans Willie Jackson (1896 or 1897 - after 1930) was an American blues and jazz singer, active in New Orleans, Louisiana and New York City in the 1920s.

He sang blues, jazz, and comic numbers. He frequently performed with pianist Steve Lewis at Spanish Fort, New Orleans and they recorded some phonograph records. These were made for Columbia Records between 1926 and 1928.  He also sang vocals in King Oliver's band the Dixie Syncopators. Two of his songs, "How Long" and "She Keeps it Up All the Time," are featured on several New Orleans blues and jazz anthologies. He made the first recording of the track "T.B. Blues", which later became more associated with Victoria Spivey.

References

External links
New Orleans Willie Jackson @ Discogs.com

Jazz musicians from New Orleans
Blues musicians from New Orleans
Singers from Louisiana
Year of birth missing
Year of death missing